Eva Birnerová and Stéphanie Foretz Gacon were the defending champions, having won the event in 2010, but chose not to compete in 2011.

Yuliya Beygelzimer and Margalita Chakhnashvili won the tournament, defeating Réka-Luca Jani and Katalin Marosi in the final, 3–6, 6–1, [10–8].

Seeds

Draw

References 
 Draw

Smart Card Open Monet Plus - Doubles